Battus crassus, the Crassus swallowtail, is a species of butterfly from the family Papilionidae.

Description
A very long-winged species. Forewing with white patches in and below the cell; hindwing with large white costal area, which in the male reaches to the base. In the subspecies lepidus Fldr. the white patches on the upper surface of the forewing are absent.

The black-brown larva (probably variable in its ground colour) has no spots. The thoracic hump of the pupa is very long and divided at the tip.

Food plants
The larvae feed on:
Aristolochia cymbifera
Aristolochia esperanzae
Aristolochia gigantea
Aristolochia macroura
Aristolochia veraguensis
Aristolochia odora
Aristolochia didyma
Aristolochia brasiliensis

Subspecies
Battus crassus crassus (Peru, Surinam, Brazil: Amazonas, Rio de Janeiro, northern Argentina: Misiones)
Battus crassus hirundo (Röber, 1925) (northern Bolivia)
Battus crassus paraensis (Brown, 1994) (Brazil: Pará)
Battus crassus lepidus (C. & R. Felder, 1861) (Costa Rica, Venezuela, western Colombia, western Ecuador)

Status
Widespread but solitary and rarely collected.

HERE

References

Lewis, H. L., 1974 Butterflies of the World  Page 23, figure 2.
Edwin Möhn, 2002 Schmetterlinge der Erde, Butterflies of the world Part V (5), Papilionidae II:Battus. Edited by Erich Bauer and Thomas Frankenbach Keltern : Goecke & Evers ; Canterbury : Hillside Books.   Illustrates and identifies 14 species and 49 subspecies. Plate 14, figures 7-8, plate 15, figures 1-3, plate 20, figures 5-6, title figures 1-2.
Paul Smart, 1976 The Illustrated Encyclopedia of the Butterfly World in Color. London, Salamander: Encyclopedie des papillons. Lausanne, Elsevier Sequoia (French language edition)   page 159 fig.16 (Peru).

External links

Butterflycorner Images from Naturhistorisches Museum Wien

Papilionidae of South America
crassus
Butterflies described in 1777
Taxa named by Pieter Cramer